Mount Hayton is a peak,  high, in the southern portion of the East Quartzite Range in Victoria Land, Antarctica. The topographical feature was so named by the New Zealand Federated Mountain Clubs Antarctic Expedition (NZFMCAE), 1962–63, for J.S. Hayton, a field assistant in the party. The peak was first climbed on December 18, 1962, by NZFMCAE party members. The mountain lies situated on the Pennell Coast, a portion of Antarctica lying between Cape Williams and Cape Adare.

See also
Camp Ridge

References

Mountains of Victoria Land
Pennell Coast